Robert James Beecroft (born 11 January 1952) is a former Australian rules footballer who played for the Fitzroy Football Club in the Victorian Football League (VFL), Swan Districts Football Club in the Western Australian National Football League (WANFL) and the Woodville Football Club in the South Australian National Football League (SANFL).

Beecroft made his debut with Swan Districts in 1970, playing 126 games as a ruckman, being named All Australian for his performance in the 1972 Perth Carnival and the Swan's Best and Fairest award. He played for Western Australia three years later and was recruited by Fitzroy for the following season.

As a key forward for the Lions, Beecroft topped their goalkicking list four times with a best of 87 goals in 1979 which was at the time a club record. He kicked 10 goals in a match twice and by the end of his short VFL career he had managed 291 goals.

He returned to the SANFL with Woodville, where he played 86 games, kicking 219 goals.

Beecroft finished his career at the Encounter Bay Football Club where he coached the Bays to the 1989 premiership.

References

External links

1952 births
Australian rules footballers from Western Australia
Fitzroy Football Club players
Woodville Football Club players
Swan Districts Football Club players
Western Australian State of Origin players
All-Australians (1953–1988)
Living people